This is a list of aircraft in alphabetical order beginning with 'F'.

Fa

FAB 
(Flugwissenschaftliche Arbeitsgemeinschaft Bremen)
 ESS 641

FABE
(Fábrica Brasileira de Aeronaves, Ltda)
 FABE UT-23 Stol Tractor
 FABE EX-27 Bumerangue Cross Country
 FABE AG-21 Falcão Agrícola
 FABE AC-22 Falcão Treinador

Fabian 
 Fabian Levente

Fabre 
(Henry Fabre)
Fabre Hydravion

Fabrica de Avioanes 
see: SET

Fabrica de Galleao
 Niess 5FG
 PAR 8FG Guanabara

FAdA
(Fábrica Argentina de Aviones "Brigadier San Martín" S.A. formerly FMA)
see: Fábrica Militar de Aviones

Fábrica Militar de Aviones 
(Abbreviated FMA)
 Ae. - "Dirección General de Aerotécnica" (1927–1936)
 F.M.A. - for "Fábrica Militar de Aviones" (1938–1943)
 I.Ae. - for "Instituto Aerotécnico" (1943–1952)
 IA - meaning not specified (1952–2007)
 FAdeA - Fábrica Argentina de Aviones "Brigadier San Martín" S.A.
 FMA I.Ae.20 El Boyero
 FMA I.Ae 24 Calquin
 FMA IAe 27 Pulqui I
 FMA IAe 30 Namcu
 FMA IAe 33 Pulqui II
 FMA IAe 35 Huanquero
 FMA IAe 38
 FMA IAe 45 Quarandi
 FMA IA 58 Pucará
 FMA IA-59
 FMA IA 63 Pampa
 FMA SAIA 90
 FMA ATL
 FAdeA IA 100

Fachschule für Ultraleicht und Motorflug 
(Fachschule für Ultraleicht- und Motorflug GmbH (FUL), Hörselberg-Hainich, Thuringia, Germany)
FUL MA 30 Graffiti

FAG Chemnitz 
(Flugtechnischen Arbeitsgemeinschaft der Staatlichen Akademie für Technik - Chemnitz)
 FAG Chemnitz C-1
 FAG Chemnitz C-2
 FAG Chemnitz C-3
 FAG Chemnitz C-4
 FAG Chemnitz C-5
 FAG Chemnitz C-6
 FAG Chemnitz C-7
 FAG Chemnitz C-8
 FAG Chemnitz C-9
FAG Chemnitz C10
 FAG Chemnitz C-11

Fliegende 
 Fliegende Panzerfaust

FAG Hamburg 
(Flugtechnische Arbeitgemeinschaft an der H.T.L. Hamburg)
 FAG Hamburg Werk Nr.1
 FAG Hamburg Kobold
 FAG Hamburg Brummer

FAG Stettin 
(Flugtechnische Arbeitgemeinschaft an der H.T.L. Stettin)
 FAG Stettin 4
 FAG Stettin La 11

Fairchild 
(Walter L Fairchild, Mineola, NY)
 Fairchild 1910 Monoplane

Fairchild 
(Fairchild, Fairchild-Hiller, Fairchild-Republic, Fairchild-Swearingen, Fairchild-Dornier)
 Fairchild-Republic A-10 Thunderbolt II
 Fairchild AT-13 Gunner
 Fairchild AT-14 Gunner
 Fairchild AT-21 Gunner
 Fairchild BQ-3
 Fairchild C-8
 Fairchild C-24
 Fairchild C-26 Metroliner
 Fairchild C-31
 Fairchild C-61 Forwarder
 Fairchild C-82 Packet
 Fairchild C-86 Forwarder
 Fairchild C-88
 Fairchild C-96
 Fairchild C-119 Flying Boxcar
 Fairchild AC-119 Shadow/Stinger
 Fairchild C-120 Packplane
 Fairchild C-123 Provider
 Fairchild C-128 Flying Boxcar
 Fairchild C-138
 Fairchild XC-941
 Fairchild F-1
 Fairchild GK
 Fairchild JK
 Fairchild J2K
 Fairchild JQ
 Fairchild J2Q
 Fairchild NQ
 Fairchild PT-19
 Fairchild PT-23
 Fairchild PT-26
 Fairchild R2K
 Fairchild RQ
 Fairchild R2Q
 Fairchild R4Q
 Fairchild SBF
 Fairchild SOK
 Fairchild T-31
 Fairchild-Republic T-46A Eaglet
 Fairchild-Hiller AU-23 Peacemaker
 Fairchild VZ-5
 Fairchild 21
 Fairchild 22
 Fairchild 24
 Fairchild 41
 Fairchild 42 Foursome
 Fairchild 45
 Fairchild 45-80 Sekani
 Fairchild 46-A
 Fairchild 51
 Fairchild 71
 Fairchild 72
 Fairchild 81
 Fairchild 82
 Fairchild 91 (A-942-A) Baby Clipper
 Fairchild 91B (A-942-B) Jungle Clipper
 Fairchild 95
 Fairchild 100
 Fairchild 135
 Fairchild 140
 Fairchild 150
 Fairchild-Dornier 228
 Fairchild-Dornier 328
 Fairchild-Dornier 328JET
 Fairchild-Dornier 728
 Fairchild-Dornier 728JET
 Fairchild-Dornier 928
 Fairchild Argus
 Fairchild Cornell PT-26 RCAF name
 Fairchild F-11
 Fairchild F-27
 Fairchild F-47
 Fairchild FB-3
 Fairchild FC-1
 Fairchild FC-2
 Fairchild-Hiller FH-227
 Fairchild FT-1
 Fairchild KR-21
 Fairchild KR-31
 Fairchild KR-34
 Fairchild KR-125
 Fairchild KR-135
 Fairchild LXF1
 Fairchild M-62
 Fairchild M-84
 Fairchild M-92
 Fairchild M-186
 Fairchild M-224
 Fairchild M-232
 Fairchild-Swearingen Merlin
 Fairchild-Swearingen Metro
 Fairchild-Swearingen Metroliner
 Fairchild-Hiller FH-1100
 Fairchild-Hiller PC-6 Porter
 Fairchild Super 71
 Fairchild LXF
 Fairchild Navy Experimental Type F Amphibious Transport

Fairey Aviation Company 
(For the Belgian component see Avions Fairey)
 Fairey III
 Fairey Albacore
 Fairey Atalanta (aircraft)
 Fairey Barracuda
 Fairey Battle
 Fairey Campania
 Fairey F.2
 Fairey Fantome
 Fairey Fawn
 Fairey FC1
 Fairey FD1
 Fairey FD2
 Fairey Feroce
 Fairey Ferret
 Fairey Firefly
 Fairey Firefly I
 Fairey Firefly II
 Fairey Fleetwing
 Fairey Flycatcher
 Fairey Fox
 Fairey Fremantle
 Fairey Fulmar
 Fairey G.4/31
 Fairey Gannet
 Fairey Gannet AEW.3
 Fairey Gannet AEW.7
 Fairey Gordon
 Fairey FB-1 Gyrodyne
 Fairey Hamble Baby
 Fairey Hendon
 Fairey Jet Gyrodyne
 Fairey Kangourou
 Fairey Long-range Monoplane
 Fairey N.4
 Fairey N.9
 Fairey N.10
 Fairey Pintail
 Fairey Primer
 Fairey Rotodyne
 Fairey S.9/30
 Fairey Seafox
 Fairey Seal
 Fairey Spearfish
 Fairey Swordfish
 Fairey T.S.R.1
 Fairey Titania
 Fairey Ultra-light Helicopter

Fairtravel 
 Fairtravel Linnet

Fajr 
(Fajr Aviation & Composites Industry)
 Fajr F.3 ( Cirrus SR-20 copy/modification)
 Fajr Faez (Colomban Cri-Cri copy)
 Fajr F.20

Falck 
(William Falck, Warwick, NY)
 Falck Chester Special
 Falck Special

Falcomposite
 Falcomposite Furio

Falcon
(Falcon Racers Inc.)
 Falcon Special
 Falcon Special II

Falconar 
((Chris) Falconar Avia Ltd, Edmonton, Canada)
 Falconar Teal
 Falconar AMF-Super 14D Maranda
 Falconar AMF-14H Maranda
 Falconar Cub Major
 Falconar Majorette
 Falconar F9A
 Falconar F10A
 Falconar F11A Sporty
 Falconar F11E Sporty
 Falconar F12A Cruiser
 Falconar ARV-1K Golden Hawk
 Falconar ARV-1L Golden Hawk
 Falconar Master X
 Falconar Minihawk
 Falconar SAL Mustang
 Falconar Turbi D5

FAMA 
(Fábrica Argentina de Materiales Aerospaciales)
 FAMA IA 58 Pucará
 FAMA IA 58C Pucará Charlie
 FAMA IA 66 Pucará
 FMA IA 70
 Embraer/FMA CBA 123 Vector (CBA - Cooperación Brasil-Argentina (Spanish), and Cooperação Brasil-Argentina (Portuguese)
 FAMA IA 63 Pampa

Famà 
(Famà Helicopters srl)
 Famà Kiss 209

Fanaero-Chile 
 Fanaero-Chile Chincol

Fane 
Fane F.1/40

Fantasy Air 
 Fantasy Air Allegro
 Jora Jora

Faradair
(Faradair Aerospace)
 Faradair Aerospace BEHA

Faria 
(Lawrence Faria, Richmond, OH)
 Faria Sport

Farina 
(Farina Aircraft Corp, 690 8 Ave, New York, NY)
 Farina 1930 Aeroplane

Farman Aviation Works 
(Société Anonyme des Usines Farman (S.A.U.F.) / Société Henry and Maurice Farman)
(Dick, Maurice and Henry Farman)

Maurice Farman 
 Maurice Farman MF.1
 Maurice Farman MF.2
 Maurice Farman MF.5
 Maurice Farman MF.6
 Maurice Farman MF.6bis
 Maurice Farman MF.7 Longhorn
 Maurice Farman MF.8
 Maurice Farman MF.9
 Maurice Farman MF.11 Shorthorn
 Maurice Farman MF.12
 Maurice Farman MF.16
 Maurice Farman Coupe Michelin
 Maurice Farman Hydro-Aeroplane I
 Maurice Farman Hydro-Aeroplane II

Henry Farman 
 Henry Farman III
 Henry Farman Biplane
 Henry Farman HFC
 Henry Farman HFC-1
 Henry Farman HF.1
 Henry Farman HF.1bis
 Henry Farman HF.2/2
 Henry Farman HF.6
 Henry Farman HF.7
 Henry Farman HF.10
 Henry Farman HF.10bis
 Henry Farman HF.11
 Henry Farman HF.11 hydroplane
 Henry Farman HF.12
 Henry Farman HF.14
 Henry Farman HF.14 hydroplane
 Henry Farman HF.15
 Henry Farman HF.16
 Henry Farman HF.17
 Henry Farman HF.18 hydroplane
 Henry Farman HF.19 hydroplane
 Henry Farman HF.20
 Henry Farman HF.21
 Henry Farman HF.22
 Henry Farman HF.23
 Henry Farman HF.24
 Henry Farman HF.25
 Henry Farman HF.27
 Henry Farman HF.30
 Henry Farman HF.31
 Henry Farman HF.33
 Henry Farman HF.35
 Henry Farman HF.36
 Henry Farman HF.206

Farman 
 Farman Aviette
 Farman Blanchard built by Farman to a design by Maurice Blanchard, 1921
 Farman BN.4 Super Goliath four-engined bomber 1921
 Farman Moustique
 Farman FF 65 Sport
 Farman F.1,40
 Farman F.1,40bis
 Farman F.1,40ter
 Farman F.1,41 (aka Army Type 70)
 Farman F.1,41bis
 Farman F.1,41 H
 Farman F.1,46
 Farman F.2,41
 Farman F-3 Bis Jabiru
 Farman F-3X Jabiru related to F.120 Jabiru.
 Farman F-4S
 Farman F.21
 Farman F.30
 Farman F.31
 Farman F.40
 Farman F.40 H
 Farman F.40bis
 Farman F.40ter
 Farman F.40 QC
 Farman F.40 P
 Farman F.41
 Farman F.41 H
 Farman F.41bis
 Farman F.41bis H
 Farman F.43 (1915-1918) - reconnaissance
 Farman F.45
 Farman F.46
 Farman F.47
 Farman F.48
 Farman F.49
 Farman F.50 (1918)
 Farman F.50 (flying boat)
 Farman F.51
 Farman F.60 Goliath: Civil passenger transport version, powered by two 260-hp (194-kW) Salmson CM.9 radial piston engines.
 Farman FF.60: Designation of the first three prototype F.60 airliners.
 Farman F.60bis: This designation was given to transport version, powered by two 300 hp (224 kW) Salmson 9Az engines.
 Farman F.60 Bn.2: Three-seat night bomber evolved from the F.60 Goliath. It was equipped with two 260 hp Salmson 9Zm engines, and 210 were delivered to French naval and army aviation.
 Farman F.60 Torp: Torpedo-bomber floatplane, powered by two Gnome-Rhone Jupiter radial piston engines.
 Farman F.60M: Blunt-nose version of 1924, powered by two 310 hp (231 kW) Renault 12Fy engines.
 Farman F.61: An F.60 equipped with two 300 hp (224 kW) Renault 12Fe engines, which gave it better performance. Only two were built.
 Farman F.62 BN.4: Export version for the Soviet Union, powered by two 450 hp (336 kW) Lorraine-Dietrich V-12 engines.
 Farman F.63 BN.4: Similar to the F.62 BN.4 export version, powered by two 450 hp (336 kW) Gnome-Rhone Jupiter radial piston engines.
 Farman F.65: This version was built for the French Navy, it could be fitted with interchangeable float or landing gear.
 Farman F.66 BN.3: One Jupiter-powered aircraft was built, intended to be exported to Romania.
 Farman F.68 BN.4: Thirty-two Jupiter-powered bomber aircraft exported to Poland.
 Farman F.4X: One special Goliath aircraft, powered by four Salmson radial piston engines in tandem pairs.
 Farman F.70
 Farman F.71
 Farman F.72
 Farman F.73
 Farman F.74
 Farman F.75
 Farman F.76
 Farman F.80
 Farman F.81
 Farman F.85 EP2
 Farman F.85 ET2
 Farman F.90
 Farman F.91
 Farman F.110
 Farman F.115
 Farman F.120 single-engined bomber
 Farman F.120 Jabiru (tri-motor transport)
 Farman F.121 Jabiru
 Farman F.122
 Farman F.123
 Farman F.124
 Farman F.130
 Farman F.130-T
 Farman F.140 Super Goliath: Super-heavy bomber prototype, powered by four 500 hp (373 kW) Farman engines in tandem pairs.
 Farman F.141 Super Goliath
 Farman F.150
 Farman F.150bis
 Farman F.160
 Farman F.160 A.2
 Farman F.160 BN.4
 Farman F.161
 Farman F.162
 Farman F.163
 Farman F.165
 Farman F.166
 Farman F.167
 Farman F.168
 Farman F.169
 Farman F.170 Jabiru
 Farman F.171
 Farman F.180 Oiseau bleu (Blue Bird)
 Farman F.180-T Oiseau bleu with new, longer fuselage
 Farman F.190
 Farman F.191
 Farman F.192
 Farman F.193
 Farman F.194
 Farman F.195
 Farman F.196
 Farman F.197
 Farman F.198
 Farman F.199
 Farman F.200 (1923)
 Farman F.200
 Farman F.201
 Farman F.202
 Farman F.203
 Farman F.204
 Farman F.205
 Farman F.206
 Farman F.209
 Farman F.211
 Farman F.212
 Farman F.220
 Farman F.221
 Farman F.222
 Farman F.223
 Farman F.230
 Farman F.231
 Farman F.232
 Farman F.233
 Farman F.234
 Farman F.235
 Farman F.236
 Farman F.238
 Farman F.239
 Farman F.250
 Farman F.268
 Farman F.269
 Farman F.270
 Farman F.271
 Farman F.280
 Farman F.281
 Farman F.282
 Farman F.290
 Farman F.291
 Farman F.291/1
 Farman F.293
 Farman F.300
 Farman F.301
 Farman F.302
 Farman F.303
 Farman F.304
 Farman F.305
 Farman F.306
 Farman F.310
 Farman F.350
 Farman F.351
 Farman F.352
 Farman F.353
 Farman F.354
 Farman F.355
 Farman F.356
 Farman F.357
 Farman F.358
 Farman F.359
 Farman F.360
 Farman F.361
 Farman F.368
 Farman F.370
 Farman F.380
 Farman F.390
 Farman F.391
 Farman F.392
 Farman F.393
 Farman F.400
 Farman F.401
 Farman F.402
 Farman F.403
 Farman F.404
 Farman F.405
 Farman F.406
 Farman F.410
 Farman F.420
 Farman F.430
 Farman F.431
 Farman F.432
 Farman F.433
 Farman F.450
 Farman F.451
 Farman F.455
 Farman F.460 Alizé
 Farman F.480 Alizé
 Farman F.500 Monitor I
 Farman F.510 Monitor II
 Farman F.520 Monitor III
 Farman F.521 Monitor III
 Farman F.1000
 Farman F.1001
 Farman F.1002
 Farman F.1010
 Farman F.1020
 Farman F.1021
 Farman NC.223
 Farman NC.410
 Farman NC.433
 Farman NC.470
 Farman NC.471

Farman-Standard 
(Farman-Standard Corp.)
 Farman-Standard D-25A

Farnborough
(Farnborough Aircraft / Richard noble)
 Farnborough F1 Kestrel

Farner 
(Willi Farner / Farner-Werke AG / F+W)
 Farner WF.12
 Farner WF.21/C4
 F+W C-3605

Farnham 
(Lawrence Farnham, Fort Collins, CO)
 Farnham FC-1 Fly-Cycle

Farrington 
(Farrington Aircraft Corp, Paducah, KY)
Farrington Twinstar
Farrington 18A

Fasig-Turner 
(Charles P Fasig & Charles Turner)
 Fasig-Turner 1924 Biplane

FASTec 
(Advanced Technology Products Inc, Worcester, MA)
 FASTec Electra-plane

Faucett
(Cia. de Aviacion Faucett)
 Faucett F-19

Faust 
(Elmer Faust, dba Cody Aero Services, Cody, WY)
 Faust 3 (a.k.a. Faust 301 and Faust PA-12)

Fauvel 
 Fauvel AV.1
 Fauvel AV.2
 Fauvel AV.3
 Fauvel AV.7
 Fauvel AV.10
 Fauvel AV.14
 Fauvel AV.17
 Fauvel AV.22, 221 and 222
 Fauvel AV.28
 Fauvel AV.29
 Fauvel AV.31
 Fauvel AV.36 and 361
 Fauvel AV.42
 Fauvel AV.44
 Fauvel AV.45 and 451
 Fauvel AV.46
 Fauvel AV.48
 Fauvel AV.60
 Fauvel AV.61

Fawcett 
 Fawcett 120

Fb

FBA 
(Franco British Aviation / Hydravions Schreck-F.B.A.)
 FBA Type A
 FBA Type B
 FBA Type C
 FBA Type D (Avion Canon)
 FBA Type H
 FBA Type S
 FBA 10
 FBA 11
 FBA 13
 FBA 14
 FBA 16
 FBA 17
 FBA 19
 FBA 21
 FBA 23
 FBA 270
 FBA 290
 FBA 310
 FBA Avion Canon
 FBA 1 Ca2
 FBA triplane flying boat

Fd

FD-Composites 
(FD-Composites, Arbing, Austria)
FD-Composites Arrow Copter AC 10
FD-Composites Arrow Copter AC 20

Fe

Federal 
(Federal Aircraft & Motor Corp, New York, NY)
 Federal Army Tractor

Federal 
(Federal Aircraft Corp, San Bernardino, CA)
 Federal CM-1 Lone Eagle
 Federal CM-2 a.k.a. (General Pilot)
 Federal CM-3
 Federal XPT-1

Federal 
(Federal Aircraft Ltd, Montreal Canada)
 Federal AT-20

Fedorov 
(D. D. Fedorov)
 Fedorov DF-1

Fefolov
(Igor Fefolov)
 Fefolov F-1
 Fefolov F-3
 Fefolov F-5
 Fefolov F-7

Feiro
(Feigl &  Lajos Rotter)
 Feiro I
 Feiro Dongo
 Feiro Daru

Felio 
(Harold G Felio, Los Angeles, CA)
 Felio Ranger SP-2

Felix 
(Charles Felix, Hatfield, PA)
 Felix A

Felixstowe 
Felixstowe Porte Baby
Felixstowe Porte Super Baby
Felixstowe F.1
Felixstowe F.2
Felixstowe F.3
Felixstowe F.5
Felixstowe Fury

Fellabaum 
(J R Fellabaum, Toledo, OH)
 Fellabaum JRF-22 Starfire

Fellot-Lacour 
(Fellot-Lacour)
 Fellot-Lacour FL.4

Fernas
 Fernas 142

Feniks OKB
 Feniks Kamatik

Ferber 
(Ferdinand Ferber)
 Ferber I
 Ferber II
 Ferber III
 Ferber IV
 Ferber V
 Ferber VI
 Ferber VII
 Ferber VIII
 Ferber IX

Féré 
(René Féré)
 Féré F.3

Fernic 
((George B) Fernic Aircraft Corp, 3493 Richmond Terrace, Staten Island, NY)
 Fernic T-9 (a.k.a. FT-1X and FT-9)
 Fernic T-10 Cruisaire

Ferrière 
(Louis Ferrière)
 Ferrière LF.02
 Ferrière LF.03

Fetterman 
((Fred O) Fetterman Aircraft Corp, Brooklyn, NY)
 Fetterman Chick-a-dee

Fetters
(Arthur Haldane Fetters)
 Fetters 1921 Sport biplane

Feugray 
(Gérard Feugray)
 Feugray TR-200
 Feugray TR-260
 Feugray TR-300
 Feugray TR-3250
 Feugray-Fordan ASA-200
 Feugray-Fordan ASA-260

Ff

FFA 
(Flug- und Fahrzeugwerke Altenrhein / Federal Institute of Technology – (Eidgenössische Technische Hochschule Zürich))
 FFA AS-202 Bravo
 FFA D-3800
 FFA N.20 Aiguillon
 FFA N.20.1 Arbalete
 FFA N.20.2 Arbalete Glider
 FFA P-16
 FFA Diamant
 FFA Ka-Bi-Vo

FFT
(FFT GESELLSCHAFTFUR FLUGZEUG- UND
FASERVERBUND-TECHNOLOGIE mbH)
 FFT SC01 Speed Canard
 FFT Eurotrainer 2000

FFV Aerotech 
 FFV Aerotech BA-14 Starling

FFVS 
(Kungliga Flygförvaltningens Flygverkstad i Stockholm - Royal Air Administration Aircraft Factory in Stockholm)
 FFVS J.22

Fg

FGP 
 FGP 227

Fi

Fiat Aviazione 
(Fabbrica Italiana Automobili Torino - Italian Automobile Factory of Turin)
 Fiat A.120
 Fiat AN.1
 Fiat APR.2
 Fiat ARF (Aeroplano-Rosatelli-Fiat)
 Fiat AS.1
 Fiat AS.2
 Fiat BGA
 Fiat BR
 Fiat BR.1
 Fiat BR.2
 Fiat BR.3
 Fiat BR.4
 Fiat BR.20 Cicogna
 Fiat BRG (Bombardiere Rosatelli Gigante - Giant Rosatelli Bomber)
 Fiat C.29
 Fiat CR.1
 Fiat CR.2
 Fiat CR.5
 Fiat CR.10
 Fiat CR.10 Idro
 Fiat CR.20
 Fiat CR.20 Idro
 Fiat CR.23
 Fiat CR.25
 Fiat CR.30
 Fiat CR.32
 Fiat CR.33
 Fiat CR.40
 Fiat CR.41
 Fiat CR.42
 Fiat G.2
 Fiat G.5
 Fiat G.8
 Fiat G.12
 Fiat G.18
 Fiat G.26
 Fiat G.46
 Fiat G.49
 Fiat G.50 Freccia
 Fiat G.51
 Fiat G.52
 Fiat G.55 Centauro
 Fiat G.56
 Fiat G.57
 Fiat G.59
 Fiat G.80
 Fiat G.82
 Fiat G.91
 Fiat G.212
 Fiat G.218
 Fiat G.222
 Fiat R.2
 Fiat R.22
 Fiat R.700
 Fiat TR.1
 Fiat 7002  Helicopter
 Fiat MM.1
 Fiat MM.2

FIAT-CMASA 
(Fabbrica Italiana Automobili Torino - Costruzioni Meccaniche Aeronautiche S.A.)
 Fiat MF.4
 Fiat MF.5
 Fiat MF.6
 Fiat MF.10
 Fiat AS.14
 Fiat RS.14
 Fiat CS.15

FIAT-CANSA 
(Fabbrica Italiana Automobili Torino - Costruzioni Aeronautiche Novaresi S.A.)
 FIAT-CANSA FC.11
 FIAT-CANSA FC.12
 FIAT-CANSA FC.20

Fiberdyne 
(Fiberdyne Associates Inc, West Chester, PA)
 Fiberdyne XRG-165A Glaticopter

Fiedor 
(Ludwick Fiedor, Cleveland, OH)
 Fiedor Bluewing

Field 
(Raymond Field, 208 N Erie St, Wichita, KS)
 Field Midwing

Field 
(K G Field, State Market, Seattle, WA)
 Field A

Fieseler 
(Gerhard Fieseler Werke GmbH)
 Fieseler F 1 Tigerschwalbe
 Fieseler F 2 Tiger
 Fieseler F 3 Wespe
 Fieseler F 4
 Fieseler F 5
 Fieseler F 6
 Fieseler Fi 97
 Fieseler Fi 98
 Fieseler Fi 99 Jungtiger
 Fieseler Fi 103
 Fieseler Fi 103R Selbstopfer
 Fieseler Fi 156 Storch StorK
 Fieseler Fi 157
 Fieseler Fi 158
 Fieseler Fi 166
 Fieseler Fi 167
 Fieseler Fi 168
 Fieseler Fi 253 Spatz (Sparrow)
 Fieseler Fi 256
 Fieseler Fi 333

Fife 
(Ray Fife, Coronado, CA)
 Fife-Beachey Beachey replica

Fike 
(William J Fike, Anchorage AK and Salt Lake City, UT)
 Fike Model A
 Fike Model B
 Fike Model C
 Fike Model D
 Fike Model E
 Fike Model F

Filper 
(Filper Research Corp, San Ramon and Livermore, CA)
 Filper Helicopter (N9712C)
 Fliper test rig
 Filper Beta 200
 Filper Beta 200A (N5000F)
 Filper Beta 300
 Filper Beta 400
 Filper Beta 400A (N5003F)

Finklea 
(Finklea Brothers, Leland, MS)
 Finklea FT-1 Trainer
 Finklea Model 1933

Firebird
(Bitburg, Germany)
Firebird Choice Zip Bi
Firebird Debute
Firebird Grid
Firebird Hornet
Firebird Sub-One
Firebird Tribute
Firebird Z-One

Firestone 
(1940: G&A (Gliders & Aircraft) Div, Firestone Tire & Rubber Co, Willow Grove, PA 1946: Firestone Aircraft Div on acquisition of Pitcairn-Larsen Autogiros.)
 Firestone H-9
 Firestone H-14
 Firestone H-19
 Firestone XR-9
 Firestone XR-14
 Firestone Model GA-45
 Firestone Model GA-50

Firecatcher
(Firecatcher Aircraft)
 Firecatcher F-45

First Strike 
(First Strike Aviation Inc (pres: Bobby Baker), Pigott, AR)
 First Strike Bobcat
 First Strike Super Cat

Fisher 
(Fisher Aero Corporation)
 Fisher Culite
 Fisher Flyer
 Fisher Barnstormer
 Fisher Boomerang
 Fisher Culex
 Fisher Mariah
 Fisher FP-101
 Fisher FP-202 Koala
 Fisher FP-303
 Fisher Super Koala
 Fisher FP-404
 Fisher FP-505 Skeeter
 Fisher FP-606 Sky Baby
 Fisher Classic
 Fisher Celebrity
 Fisher Horizon 1
 Fisher Horizon 2
 Fisher Dakota Hawk
 Fisher Avenger
 Fisher R-80 Tiger Moth
 Fisher Youngster

Fisher 
(Fisher Body Works, Cleveland, OH)
 Fisher-Caproni Ca.46 (license built Caproni Ca.46)
 Fisher-de Havilland DH-4 (license built Airco DH-4)
 Fisher-Standard SJ-1 (license built Standard SJ-1)

Fisher 
(Edward Fisher, Kansas City, MO)
 Fisher FL-1

Fisher 
(Fisher Div, General Motors Corp, Cleveland, OH)
 Fisher P-75 Eagle

Fisher 
((Gene and Darlene Jackson-Hanson) Fisher Flying Products, Edgely, ND)
 Fisher FP-101
 Fisher FP-202 Koala
 Fisher FP-303
 Fisher FP-404
 Fisher FP-505 Skeeter
 Fisher FP-606 Sky Baby
 Fisher Avenger
 Fisher Barnstormer
 Fisher Boomerang
 Fisher Classic
 Fisher Flyer
 Fisher Horizon
 Fisher Dakota Hawk
 Fisher Horizon
 Fisher Celebrity
 Fisher R-80 Tiger Moth
 Fisher Youngster

Fisher-Boretski 
 Fisher-Boretski FiBo-2

Fishercraft 
(Ed Fisher, Painesville, OH)
 Fishercraft Zippy Sport

Fisk 
(Edwin Fisk)
 Fisk 1911 Monoplane
 Fisk 1919 Biplane
 Fisk-Standard

Fitzsimmons 
(Frank Fitzsimmons, Hempstead, NY)
 Fitzsimmons 1911 Monoplane

Fizir 
(Rudolf Fizi)
 Fizir-Maybach
 Fizir-Mercedes
 Fizir-Wright
 Fizir-Gypsi
 Fizir-Jupiter
 Fizir-Vega
 Fizir-Loren (sic)
 Fizir-Lorraine
 Fizir 85 CV
 Fizir AF-2 - flying boat (1931)
 Fizir F1G Titan
 Fizir F1G Kastor
 Fizir F1M -  two-seat reconnaissance floatplane (1930)
 Fizir FN - two-seat trainer
 Fizir FN-H - two-seat training floatplane (1931)
 Fizir F1V
 Fizir FP-1
 Fizir FP-2
 Fizir FT Nastavni (also known as the Zmaj FP-2??)
 Fizir FT-1 Nebošja

Fk

FK-Lightplanes
 FK-Lightplanes SW51 Mustang

Fl

Flaeming Air 
(Brandenburg, Germany)
Flaeming Air FA 01 Smaragd
Flaeming Air FA 02
Flaeming Air FA 04 Peregrine
Flaeming Air FA 04 SL

Flagg 
(Flaggships Inc, San Diego, CA)
 Flagg F.13 Bug (a.k.a. Flagg-Raymond)
 Flagg F.15 San Diego (a.k.a. FAC Special)
 Flagg Student Pal (a.k.a. Marshall Flyer)

Flagg-Snyder 
((Claude) Flagg-(Barney) Snyder, San Diego, CA)
 Flagg-Snyder Racer (later rebuilt as Butz F-1)

Flaglor 
(F K "Chuck" Flaglor, Des Plaines, IL)
 Flaglor High-Tow
 Flaglor Low-Tow
 Flaglor Scooter

Flamingo 
(Metal Aircraft Corp, Lunken Airport, Cincinnati, OH)
 Flamingo All-Metal Tranship
 Flamingo G-1
 Flamingo G-2
 Flamingo G-MT-6

Flanders 
 Flanders B.2
 Flanders B.3
 Flanders F.1
 Flanders F.2
 Flanders F.3
 Flanders F.4
 Flanders F.5
 Flanders S.2

Flaris 
 Flaris Lar 1

Fleet 
 Fleet Model 1
 Fleet Model 2
 Fleet Model 5
 Fleet Model 7 Fawn
 Fleet Finch
 Fleet Model 21
 Fleet 50 Freighter
 Fleet 60 Fort
 Fleet 80 Canuck
 Fleet helicopter

Fleetcraft 
(Fleet Airplane Corp (fdr: John B Moore), Lincoln Nebraska)
 Fleetcraft A
 Fleetcraft Cadet (a.k.a. Fleetwing Cadet)

Fleetwings 
(c.1930: Fleetwings Inc (pres: Frank or Cecil de Ganahl), Radcliffe St, Bristol, PA 1934: Plant acquired by Hall Aluminum Aircraft Co. 1941: (Henry J) Kaiser-Fleetwings Inc (pres: E E Trefethen Jr).)
 Fleetwings 1931 Monoplane
 Fleetwings A-1
 Fleetwings F-4 Sea Bird (F-401)
 Fleetwings F-5 Sea Bird
 Fleetwings BT-12 Sophomore
 Fleetwings PQ-12
 Fleetwings 23
 Fleetwings 33
 Fleetwings 36
 Fleetwings 37
 Kaiser-Fleetwings A-39
 Kaiser-Fleetwings BQ-1
 Kaiser-Fleetwings BQ-2
 Kaiser-Fleetwings BTK
 Kaiser-Fleetwings FK
 Kaiser-Fleetwings Twirleybird

Fleming 
(J W T and William G Fleming, Memphis, TN)
 Fleming 1929 Biplane

Flemming 
(Jim Flemming)
 Flemming XNU-1

Fletcher 
(Daniel & Richard Fletcher)
 Fletcher Bushbird

Fletcher 
((Wendell, Frank, Maurice) Fletcher Aviation Corp, 190 W Colorado St, Pasadena, CA)
 Fletcher BG-1
 Fletcher BG-2
 Fletcher BG-3
 Fletcher CQ-1
 Fletcher FBT-2
 Fletcher FL-23
 Fletcher FU-24
 Fletcher FD-25
 Fletcher Model 1
 Fletcher PQ-11

Fletcher's Ultralights 
(Turlock, California, USA)
Fletcher Hercules
Fletcher Hercules Cruiser
Fletcher Hercules Cross Country

Flettner 
(Flettner Flugzeugbau GmbH  / Anton Flettner G.m.b.H.)
 Flettner Gigant
 Flettner Fl 184
 Flettner Fl 185
 Flettner Fl 265
 Flettner Fl 282 Kolibri
 Flettner Fl 285
 Flettner Fl 339

Fleury 
(Robert Fleury)
 Fleury RF.10 Vedette
 Fleury RF.21 Trimard

Flexible 
(Flexible Aeroplane Co.)
 Flexible 1909 Aeroplane

Flight Design 
(Landsberied, Germany)
 Flight Design Axxess
 Flight Design Boxtair
 Flight Design C4
 Flight Design CT
 Flight Design CT2K
 Flight Design CTSW
 Flight Design CTLS
 Flight Design MC
 Flight Design CTLS-Lite
 Flight Design CTHL
 Flight Design CTLE
 Flight Design CTLSi
 Flight Design CT Supralight
 Flight Design Exxtacy
 Flight Design Stream
 Flight Design Twin

Flightsail 
(Flight Dynamics (pres: Thomas H Purcell Jr), Raleigh, NC)
 Flightsail VII

Flightstar 
(Flightstar Sportplanes)
 Flightstar
 Flightstar Formula
 Flightstar Spyder
 Flightstar Loadstar
 Flightstar e-Spyder
 Flightstar II
 Flightstar IISL
 Flightstar IISC

Flightship
 Flightship FS8 WiG

Flight Team 
(Flight Team UG & Company AG, Ippesheim, Germany)
Flight Team Spider
Flight Team Twister

Flightworks 
(Flightworks Corp, Austin, TX)
 Flightworks Capella
 Flightworks Capella XS

Fliteways 
(Fliteways Inc (Ben White), Milwaukee, WI)
 Fliteways Special

Flitzer Sportplanes 
(Aberdare, United Kingdom)
Flitzer Z-21

Florine 
(Nicolas Florine, Belgium)
 Florine Helicopter No.1
 Florine Helicopter No.2
 Florine Helicopter No.3 (1933)

Florov 
 Florov No4302

Floyd-Bean 
(Bob Bean & Tom Floyd, Inglewood, CA)
 Floyd-Bean Special

FLS 
 FLS Sprint

F L S Z 
(Flight Level Six-Zero Inc, Colorado Springs, CO)
 F L S Z Der Kricket DK-1
 F L S Z Vagrant II

Flugschule Wings 
(Spital am Pyhrn, Austria)
Flugschule Wings Alfa

Flugtechnischer Verein Spandau
 Flugtechnischer Verein Spandau 1925 monoplane

Fly Air 
(Fly Air Limited, Trudovec, Bulgaria)
Fly Air Swallow
Fly Air Trike Moster

Fly Castelluccio
(Fly Castelluccio Paramotor Paragliding and Trike srl, Ascoli Piceno, Italy)
Fly Castelluccio Diavolo
Fly Castelluccio Flash
Fly Castelluccio Mach
Fly Castelluccio SMN

Fly Hard Trikes 
(Wildwood, Georgia, United States)
Fly Hard Trikes SkyCycle

Fly Products 
(Grottammarre, Italy)
Fly Products Eco
Fly Products Flash
Fly Products Gold
Fly Products Jet
Fly Products Kompress
Fly Products Max
Fly Products Power
Fly Products Race
Fly Products Rider
Fly Products Sprint
Fly Products Thrust
Fly Products Xenit

Fly Synthesis 
 Fly Synthesis Wallaby
 Fly Synthesis Catalina
 Fly Synthesis Storch
 Fly Synthesis Syncro
 Fly Synthesis Texan

Fly Wurm 
(Paul Maiwurm, Mission Beach (San Diego), CA)
 Fly Wurm 1929 Barrelplane

Fly-Fan 
(Fly-Fan sro, Trenčín, Slovakia)
Fly-Fan Shark

FlyLatino
(FlyLatino, Latina, Italy)
 FL 100 RG

FlyNano 
(Lahti, Finland)
FlyNano Nano

Flyfabrikk
(Norske Hæren Flyfabrikk)
 Flyfabrikk 1918 biplane

Flygfabriken 
(Svenska Flygfabriken)
 Flygfabriken LN-3 Seagull

Flying Auto 
(Flying Auto Co.)
 Flying Auto 1909 Aeroplane

Flying K 
 Flying K Sky Raider
 Flying K Sky Raider II
 Flying K Super Sky Raider
 Flying K Frontier

Flying Legend 
(Caltagirone, Italy)
Flying Legend Hawker Hurricane Replica
Flying Legend Tucano Replica

Flying Machines s.r.o. 
(Rasošky, Czech Republic)
Flying Machines FM250 Vampire
Flying Machines FM301
Flying Machines B612

Flying Mercury 
(Hibbing MN.)
 Flying Mercury 1930 Monoplane

Flyitalia 
(Dovera, Italy)
Flyitalia MD3 Rider

Flylab 
(Flylab Srl, Ischitella, Italy)
Flylab Tucano

Flylight Airsports 
(Northampton, United Kingdom)
Flylight Doodle Bug
Flylight Dragonfly
Flylight E-Dragon
Flylight Motorfloater

Flyvetroppernes Værksteder 
(Flyverkorpsets Værksteder (1924–32); Flyvertroppernes Værksteder (1932-1943))
 O-Maskine. I O
 O-Maskine. II O

Flywhale
(Flywhale Aircraft)
 Flywhale Aircraft Flywhale

Fm

FMA
see:Fábrica Militar de Aviones

FMP s.r.o. 
(Prague, Czech Republic)
FMP Qualt 201

Fo

Focke-Achgelis 
(Focke-Achgelis & Co. G.m.b.H.)
Focke-Achgelis Fa 61
Focke-Achgelis Fa 223 Drache (Dragon), transport helicopter (prototype)
Focke-Achgelis Fa 224
Focke-Achgelis Fa 225
Focke-Achgelis Fa 236
Focke-Achgelis Fa 266 Hornisse (Hornet), helicopter (prototype)
Focke-Achgelis Fa 269, Experimental VTOL aircraft
Focke-Achgelis Fa 283
Focke-Achgelis Fa 284
Focke-Achgelis Fa 325
Focke-Achgelis Fa 330 Bachstelze (Wagtail), helicopter (prototype)
Focke-Achgelis Fa 336 scout helicopter (prototype), 1944

Focke-Wulf 
(Focke-Wulf Flugzeugbau G.m.b.H.)
 Focke-Wulf S 1 Two-seat high-wing trainer aircraft
 Focke-Wulf S 2 Two-seat parasol-wing trainer aircraft
 Focke-Wulf W.4 Two-seat trainer/reconnaissance floatplane
 Focke-Wulf W.7
 Focke-Wulf A 7 Storch
 Focke-Wulf A 16
 Focke-Wulf A 17 Möwe
 Focke-Wulf GL 18
 Focke-Wulf F 19 Ente
 Focke-Wulf A 20
 Focke-Wulf A 21
 Focke-Wulf GL 22
 Focke-Wulf K 23 Buchfink
 Focke-Wulf S 24
 Focke-Wulf A 26
 Focke-Wulf A 28
 Focke-Wulf A 29 Mõwe
 Focke-Wulf C 30 Heuschrecke (Cierva C.30)
 Focke-Wulf A 32
 Focke-Wulf A 33
 Focke-Wulf A 38
 Focke-Wulf S 39
 Focke-Wulf A 43
 Focke-Wulf A 47 Two-seat parasol-wing reconnaissance aircraft
 Focke-Wulf Fw 40
 Focke-Wulf Fw 42
 Focke-Wulf Fw 43 Falke
 Focke-Wulf Fw 44 Stieglitz
 Focke-Wulf Fw 47
 Focke-Wulf Fw 55 Modified Albatros L 102 two-seat trainer aircraft
 Focke-Wulf Fw 56 Stösser
 Focke-Wulf Fw 57
 Focke-Wulf Fw 58 Weihe
 Focke-Wulf Fw 61 Helicopter
 Focke-Wulf Fw 62
 Focke-Wulf Ta 152
 Focke-Wulf Ta 154
 Focke-Wulf Fw 159
 Focke-Wulf Ta 183 Huckebein Jet interceptor fighter
 Focke-Wulf Volksjäger
 Focke-Wulf Fw 186 Autogyro reconnaissance aircraft
 Focke-Wulf Fw 187 Falke
 Focke-Wulf Fw 189 Uhu
 Focke-Wulf Fw 190 Würger
 Focke-Wulf Fw 191
 Focke-Wulf Fw 200 Condor
 Focke-Wulf Fw 206
 Focke-Wulf Fw 238
 Focke-Wulf Ta 254
 Focke-Wulf Ta 283
 Focke-Wulf Fw 300
 Focke-Wulf Ta 400
 Focke-Wulf Project I
 Focke-Wulf Project III
 Focke-Wulf Project IV
 Focke-Wulf Project VII
 Focke-Wulf Project VII
 Focke-Wulf Fw Triebflügel
 Focke-Wulf Fw 1000x1000x1000

Fokker 
(Fokker Flugzeug-Werke G.m.b.H.) - Schwerin, Germany
(Fokker and Idflieg designation prefixes)
A = Unarmed single seat aircraft
B = Amphibian(*)
C = Two-seat armed reconnaissance/bomber
D = Doppeldecker (biplane fighter), later Fighter
Dr = Dreidecker (triplane fighter)
E = Eindecker (Armed monoplane fighter)
F = Transport aircraft(*)
G = Twin-engine fighter/bomber(*)
K = Kampfflugzeug (Attack aircraft)
S = Trainer (*)
T = Torpedo Bomber(*)
V = Versuchflugzeug (Experimental)
W = Wasserflugzeug (Flying Boat)
 Fokker 50
 Fokker 70
 Fokker 100
 Fokker A.I
 Fokker A.II
 Fokker A.III
 Fokker B.I (1915) reconnaissance biplane (Austro-Hungarian military designation)
 Fokker B.I (1922) flying boat (Fokker designation)
 Fokker B.II (1916) reconnaissance biplane (Austro-Hungarian military designation)
 Fokker B.II (1923) flying boat (Fokker designation)
 Fokker B.III flying boat (Fokker designation)
 Fokker B.IV flying boat (Fokker designation)
 Fokker B.V
 Fokker BA-1
 Fokker C.I
 Fokker C.II
 Fokker C.III
 Fokker C.IV
 Fokker C.V
 Fokker C.VI
 Fokker C.VII
 Fokker C.VIII
 Fokker C.IX
 Fokker C.X
 Fokker C.XI-W
 Fokker C.XII
 Fokker C.XIII-W
 Fokker C.XIV
 Fokker C.XV
 Fokker D.I
 Fokker D.II
 Fokker D.III
 Fokker D.IV
 Fokker D.V
 Fokker D.VI
 Fokker D.VII
 Fokker D.VIII
 Fokker D.IX
 Fokker D.X
 Fokker D.XI
 Fokker D.XII
 Fokker D.XIII
 Fokker D.XIV
 Fokker D.XVI
 Fokker D.XVII
 Fokker D.XIX
 Fokker D.XX
 Fokker D.XXI
 Fokker D.22
 Fokker D.23
 Fokker D.24
 Fokker DC.I
 Fokker DC.II
 Fokker Dr.I
 Fokker E.I
 Fokker E.II
 Fokker E.III
 Fokker E.IV
 Fokker E.V
 Fokker F.I triplane fighter aircraft (German military designation)
 Fokker F.I (1919) V.44 not completed; airliner (Fokker designation)
 Fokker F.II
 Fokker F.III
 Fokker F.IV
 Fokker F.V
 Fokker F.VI
 Fokker F.VII
 Fokker F.VIII
 Fokker F.IX
 Fokker F.X (1925) unbuilt project 
 Fokker F.XI
 Fokker F.XII
 Fokker F.XIII unbuilt project
 Fokker F.XIV
 Fokker F.XV  unbuilt project
 Fokker F.XVI unbuilt project
 Fokker F.XVII  unbuilt project
 Fokker F.XVIII
 Fokker F.XIX  unbuilt project
 Fokker F.XX
 Fokker F.XXI  unbuilt project
 Fokker F.XXII
 Fokker F.XXIII
 Fokker F.XXIV
 Fokker F.25 Promotor
 Fokker F.26 Phantom
 Fokker F.27 Friendship
 Fokker F.28 Fellowship
 Fokker F.29
 Fokker F.XXXVI
 Fokker F.XXXVII
 Fokker F.40
 Fokker F.56
 Fokker F.60
 Fokker G.I
 Fokker G.2
 Fokker G.3
 Fokker K.I
 Fokker M.1
 Fokker M.2
 Fokker M.3
 Fokker M.4
 Fokker M.5
 Fokker M.6
 Fokker M.7
 Fokker M.8
 Fokker M.9
 Fokker M.10
 Fokker M.14
 Fokker M.15
 Fokker M.16
 Fokker M.17
 Fokker M.18
 Fokker M.19
 Fokker M.21
 Fokker M.22
 Fokker P.1 Partner
 Fokker S-3
 Fokker S.I
 Fokker S.II
 Fokker S.III
 Fokker S.IV
 Fokker S.V
 Fokker S.VI
 Fokker S.VII
 Fokker S.IX
 Fokker S.X
 Fokker S-11
 Fokker S-12
 Fokker S-13
 Fokker S-14
 Fokker Spin
 Fokker T.II
 Fokker T.III
 Fokker T.IV
 Fokker T.V
 Fokker T.VI (1934) unbuilt four-engine heavy bomber
 Fokker T.VI (1937) unbuilt twin-boom, twin-engine bomber
 Fokker T.VII
 Fokker T.VIII
 Fokker T.IX
 Fokker T.10
 Fokker V.1
 Fokker V.2
 Fokker V.3
 Fokker V.4
 Fokker V.5
 Fokker V.6
 Fokker V.7
 Fokker V.8
 Fokker V.9
 Fokker V.10
 Fokker V.11
 Fokker V.12
 Fokker V.13
 Fokker V.14
 Fokker V.16
 Fokker V.17
 Fokker V.18
 Fokker V.20
 Fokker V.21
 Fokker V.22
 Fokker V.23
 Fokker V.24
 Fokker V.25
 Fokker V.26
 Fokker V.27
 Fokker V.28
 Fokker V.29
 Fokker V.30
 Fokker V.31
 Fokker V.33
 Fokker V.34
 Fokker V.35
 Fokker V.36
 Fokker V.37
 Fokker V.38
 Fokker V.39
 Fokker V.40
 Fokker V.41
 Fokker V.43
 Fokker V.44 not completed
 Fokker V.45
 Fokker W.1
 Fokker W.3
 Fokker W.4
 Fokker-VAK 191
 Fokker-VFW 614

Fokker-Atlantic 
 Fokker A-2 Ambulance
 Fokker A-7 Attack
 Fokker AO-1 Artillery Observation / Atlantic Observation
 Fokker B-8
 Fokker C-2
 Fokker C-5
 Fokker C-7
 Fokker C-14
 Fokker C-15
 Fokker C-16
 Fokker C-20
 Fokker CO-4
 Fokker CO-4 Mailplane
 Fokker CO-8
 Fokker FA
 Fokker FLB
 Fokker FT
 Fokker JA
 Fokker LB-2 Light Bomber
 Fokker O-27
 Fokker PW-5
 Fokker PW-6
 Fokker PW-7
 Fokker RA
 Fokker T-2
 Fokker TA
 Fokker TW-4
 Fokker B.11 amphibian built for H.S. Vanderbilt
 Fokker BA-1
 Fokker F.7
 Fokker F.8 Super Universal
 Fokker F.9
 Fokker F.10 Super Trimotor
 Fokker F.11 Flying Yacht
 Fokker F.14
 Fokker AF.15
 Fokker F.18
 Fokker F.32
 Fokker DH-4M
 Fokker-Hall H-51
 Fokker Universal Airliner & freighter
 Fokker Standard Universal
 Fokker Super Universal Airliner & freighter
 Fokker Skeeter
 Fokker Model 3
 Fokker Model 4 Universal
 Fokker Model 5
 Fokker Model 6
 Fokker Model 7
 Fokker Model 8 Skeeter
 Fokker Model 8 Super Universal
 Fokker Model 11
 Fokker Model 12
 Fokker Model 13
 Fokker Model 14

Folkerts 
(Clayton Folkerts, Moline, IL; Robertson, MO)
 Folkerts#1
 Folkerts#2
 Folkerts#3
 Folkerts#4
 Folkerts#5
 Folkerts Henderson Highwing
 Folkerts Mono-Special
 Folkerts SK-1
 Folkerts SK-2
 Folkerts SK-3
 Folkerts SK-4

Folland 
 Folland Fo.108, also known as Folland 43/37
 Folland Fo.139 Midge
 Folland Fo.145 Gnat

Follis 
(Fred E Follis, Nashville, TN)
 Follis Sport

Forbes 
(David Forbes, Atherton, CA)
 Forbes DAS-IM (a.k.a. wolfram Special)
 Forbes F-3 CobraF-3 Cobra
 Forbes Tonopah Low

Ford 
 Ford C-3
 Ford C-4
 Ford C-9
 Ford JR
 Ford RR
 Ford XB-906
 Ford 3-AT
 Ford 4-AT
 Ford 5-AT
 Ford 6-AT
 Ford 7-AT
 Ford 8-AT
 Ford 9-AT
 Ford 10-A
 Ford 11-AT
 Ford 12-A
 Ford 14-A
 Ford 15-P
 Ford Flivver
 Ford Tri-Motor
 Ford-Stout Dragonfly
 Ford-Stout 2-AT (a.k.a. Air Pullman)
 Ford Executive

Ford 
(Ford Airplane Co, Tulsa, OK)
 Ford 1931 Monoplane

Ford-Leigh 
((Alfred G) Leigh Safety Wing Inc & Brunner-Winkle Co. )
 Ford-Leigh Safety Wing

Ford-Van Auken 
(Edsel Ford & Charles Van Auken, 1302 Woodward Ave, Detroit, MI)
 Ford-Van Auken 1909 Monoplane

Forman 
(Albert V Forman, Medford OR.)
 Forman 1936 Monoplane

Forney
(Forney Manufacturing Company /  Fornaire Aircraft Co.)
 Forney F-1 Aircoupe

Fortier 
(Amilcar E Fortier, New Orleans LA.)
 Fortier 1907 Aeroplane

Foss 
(Al Foss, Rosemead CA.)
 Foss Special

Foster 
(Joe Foster & Floyd Simpson, Anderson SC.)
 Foster Grey Eagle

Foster 
(H C Foster, Vanport PA.)
 Foster 1937 Biplane
 Foster Aerodyne
 Foster Airspeed

Foster 
(Sidney Foster)
 Foster Blood, Sweat and Tears

Foster, Wikner Aircraft 
 Foster Wikner Warferry
 Foster Wikner Wicko

Fouga 
 Fouga CM.7
 Fouga CM.8
 Fouga CM.8 Acro
 Fouga CM.8/13
 Fouga CM.8/15
 Fouga CM.8/13 Sylphe démotorisé
 Fouga CM.8 R13 Cyclone
 Fouga CM.8 R13 Sylphe II
 Fouga CM.8 R13 Sylphe III
 Fouga CM.8 R9.8 Cyclope I
 Fouga CM.8 R9.5 Cyclope II
 Fouga CM.8 R8.3 Midget
 Fouga CM.71
 Fouga CM.82R Lutin
 Fouga CM.821R
 Fouga CM.88 Gémaux
 Fouga CM.10
 Fouga CM.100
 Fouga CM.101R
 Fouga CM.103R
 Fouga CM.130
 Fouga CM.170 Magister
 Fouga CM.171 Makalu
 Fouga CM.175 Zéphir

Found 
(Found Aircraft Development Inc, Parry Sound, Ontario, Canada.)
 Found Air FBA-1A
 Found Air FBA-2C Bush Hawk
 Found Air Model 100 Centennial
 Found Expedition E350
 Found FBA-1
 Found FBA-2
 Found Centennial 100

Four Winds 
 Four Winds Four winds

Fournier 
(René Fournier, Avions Fournier)
 Fournier RF-01
 Fournier RF-2
 Fournier/Alpavia RF 3
 Fournier/Alpavia/Sportavia RF 4
 Fournier/Alpavia/Sportavia RF 5
 Fournier RF-6
 Fournier RF-7
 Fournier RF-8
 Fournier RF-9
 Fournier RF-10
 Fournier SFS-31
 Fournier RF-47

Fowler 
((Robert G) Fowler Corp, San Francisco CA. / R.G. Fowler & Jay Gage)
 Fowler Wright Flyer
 Fowler-Gage Biplane

Fowler 
(Harland D Fowler, New Brunswick NJ.)
 Fowler 1928 Monoplane

Fowler 
(A C Fowler, Hurricane WV.)
 Fowler Sport

Fowler 
(Donald Fowler and Francis Gallant, Boston MA.)
 Fowler 1933 Biplane

Fox 
(Alfred C Fox, Beaverton OR.)
 Fox Sportplane

Foxcon Aviation 
(Foxcon Aviation & Research Pty, Mackay, Queensland, Australia)
Foxcon Terrier 200

Fr

Frakes Aviation 
Frakes Mohawk

Frame 
(Augustus J Frame, Columbus OH.)
 Frame Special

France-Aviation
 Denhaut Hy.479

Francis 
(Royal N "Roy" Francis, Santa Clara area CA.)
 Francis 1910 Biplane
 Francis 1911 Biplane
 Francis 1913 Biplane

Francis-Angell 
(Jerry Francis & Harold Angell, Lansing MI.)
 Francis-Angell 1947 Monoplane

Frank
(Otto Frank)
 Frank TSF 02

Franklin 
(Franklin Aircraft Corp (first as Joy Mfg Co), Franklin PA)
 Franklin Sport
 Franklin Sport 65 (Model A)
 Franklin Sport 70 (Model B)
 Franklin Sport 90

Franklin 
(Deward Franklin, Boulder City NV.)
 Franklin 1936 Monoplane

Franklin 
(Willy Franklin)
 Franklin Demon-1

Franklyn 
(George Franklyn)
 Franklyn Pea Bee

Frati 
(aircraft designed by Stelio Frati, but produced by various manufacturers)
 F.M.1 Passero
 F.M.2 Bi-Passero
 F.4 Rondone
 Caproni Trento F.5
 F.6 Airone
 F.7 Rondone
 F.8 Falco
 F.9 Sparviero (Sparrow Hawk)
 F.14 Nibbio
 F.15 Picchio
 F.20 Pegaso
 F.20TP Condor
 F.22 Pinguino
 Golden Avio F30
 F.250
 F.260
 SF.260
 F.400 Cobra
 F.480 projected four seat Cobra
 SF.600 Canguro (en: "Kangaroo")
 F.1000
 F.1300 Jet Squalus
 F.2500
 F.3000
 F.3500 Sparviero
 Aermacchi SF.260EA - Most recent variant for Italian Air Force. 30 built
 Aeromere F.8L America
 Ambrosini F.4 Rondone
 Ambrosini F.7 Rondone II
 Aviamilano F.14 Nibbio
 Aviamilano F.8L Series I Falco
 Aviamilano F.8L Series II Falco
 Aviamilano F.250 - first prototype powered by 187 kW (250 hp) Lycoming O-540-AID
 Aviamilano F.260 - two prototypes powered by 194 kW (260 hp) Lycoming O-540-E4A5
 Caproni Trento F.5
 Ditta Movo F.M.1 Passero
 Frati BF-46 - Stelio Frati - Aeroclub de Busto Arsizio, Varese
 Frati Sky Arrow
 General Avia Airtruck
 General Avia F.15 Picchio (Italian: "Woodpecker") - prototype with Lycoming O-320 engine and three seats (1 built)
 General Avia F.15C - version with Continental IO-470 engine and tip tanks (1 built)
 General Avia F.15D - proposed version similar to F.15B with Franklin engine (not built)
 General Avia F.15E - all-metal version of F.15B with Continental IO-520K engine (1 built by General Avia)
 General Avia F.15F Delfino - two-seat version of F.15E with bubble canopy (1 built by General Avia)
 General Avia F.20TP Condor
 General Avia F.22 Pinguino
 General Avia F.200
 General Avia F.3500 Sparviero
 Italair F.20 Pegaso
 JSC Sokol F.15F Excalibur - F.15F built by JSC Sokol for HOAC
 Laverda Super Falco Series IV
 Pasotti F.6 Airone
 Pasotti F.9 Sparviero
 Procaer F.15A - initial production version with Lycoming O-360 engine and four seats (10 built by Procaer)
 Procaer F.15B - similar to F.15A but with larger-span wings and fuel tanks relocated from fuselage to wings (20 built by Procaer)
 Procaer F.400 Cobra
 Promavia F.1300 Jet Squalus
 Sequoia F.8L Falco
 SIAI Marchetti SF.260 - Production version of the F.260
 Vulcanair SF.600 Canguro (en: "Kangaroo")
 Waco Meteor

Frederick-Ames 
(Frederick-Ames Research Corp, Anaheim CA.)
Frederick-Ames EOS/SFA

Free Bird Innovations 
(Free Bird Innovations, Inc, Detroit Lakes, Minnesota, United States)
 Free Bird Sportlite SS
 Free Bird Sportlite 2
 Free Bird LiteSport II
 Free Bird LiteSport Classic
 Free Bird LiteSport Ultra
 Free Bird Sportlite 103

Free Flight
(Free Flight Aviation Pty Ltd)
 Free Flight Hornet 130S
 Free Flight Hornet 160

Free Spirit 
(Free Spirit Aircraft Co Inc, Huntington Beach CA.)
 Free Spirit RC 412

Freebird Airplane Company 
(Marshville, North Carolina, United States)
 Freebird I
 Freebird II

Freedom Aviation 
Freedom Aviation Phoenix

Freedom Lite 
(Freedom Lite Inc, Walton, Ontario, Canada)
Freedom Lite SS-11 Skywatch

Freedom Master 
(Freedom Master Corp, Merritt Island FL.)
 Freedom Master FM-2 Air Shark I

Freewind
(Freewind Aviation)
 Freewind Bumble B

Freewing 
((Hugh) Schmittle Aircraft (with Odile Legeay), Annapolis MD. )
 Freewing MK-5

FreeX
(Egling, Germany)
FreeX Arrow
FreeX Blade
FreeX Blast
FreeX FXT
FreeX Gemini
FreeX Joker
FreeX Moon

Freeze 
(Joseph C Freeze (or Freese?), Kansas City KS.)
 Freeze Monoplane

Freiberger 
(Ronald Freiberger)
 Freiberger Ron's 1

Frenard 
(Fred N Arnoldi, Columbus OH.)
 Frenard Duck

Fresh Breeze 
(Fresh Breeze GmbH & Co Kg, Wedemark, Germany)
Fresh Breeze Airbass
Fresh Breeze BulliX
Fresh Breeze Flyke
Fresh Breeze Monster
Fresh Breeze Paratour Twin
Fresh Breeze Respect
Fresh Breeze Simonini
Fresh Breeze Skip One
Fresh Breeze Snap
Fresh Breeze Solo
Fresh Breeze Super ThoriX
Fresh Breeze ThoriX
Fresh Breeze Twin
Fresh Breeze Xcitor

Freüller Valls 
 Freüller Valls MA

Friedrichshafen 
(Flugzeugbau Friedrichshafen G.m.b.H.)
 Friedrichshafen C.I
 Friedrichshafen D.I
 Friedrichshafen D.II
 Friedrichshafen D.III
 Friedrichshafen D type Quadruplane (D.III)
 Friedrichshafen FF.1
 Friedrichshafen FF.2
 Friedrichshafen FF.4
 Friedrichshafen FF.7 (placemarker re-direct)
 Friedrichshafen FF.8
 Friedrichshafen FF.9
 Friedrichshafen FF.11
 Friedrichshafen FF.15
 Friedrichshafen FF.17
 Friedrichshafen FF.19
 Friedrichshafen FF.21
 Friedrichshafen FF.27
 Friedrichshafen FF.29
 Friedrichshafen FF.30
 Friedrichshafen FF.31
 Friedrichshafen FF.33
 Friedrichshafen FF.34
 Friedrichshafen FF.35
 Friedrichshafen FF.36
 Friedrichshafen FF.37
 Friedrichshafen FF.38
 Friedrichshafen FF.39
 Friedrichshafen FF.40
 Friedrichshafen FF.41
 Friedrichshafen FF.43
 Friedrichshafen FF.44
 Friedrichshafen FF.45
 Friedrichshafen FF.46
 Friedrichshafen FF.48
 Friedrichshafen FF.49
 Friedrichshafen FF.53
 Friedrichshafen FF.54 (D.III)
 Friedrichshafen FF.55
 Friedrichshafen FF.59
 Friedrichshafen FF.60
 Friedrichshafen FF.61
 Friedrichshafen FF.62
 Friedrichshafen FF.63
 Friedrichshafen FF.64
 Friedrichshafen FF.66
 Friedrichshafen FF.67
 Friedrichshafen FF.71
 Friedrichshafen G.I
 Friedrichshafen G.II
 Friedrichshafen G.III
 Friedrichshafen G.IV
 Friedrichshafen G.V
 Friedrichshafen G.VI
 Friedrichshafen N.I

Frier 
(John Frier, 5833 Julian St, SDt Louis MO.)
 Frier 1911 Headless Triplane

Friesley 
(Friesley (Harold Friesleben) Aircraft Corp, Gridley CA.)
 Friesley Falcon

Froebe 
 Froebe helicopter

Froberg 
(Froberg Aeroplane Co, Richmond CA.)
 Froberg 1912 Biplane

Frontier Aircraft Inc 
(Vail, Colorado, United States)
Frontier MD-II

FRuBA
(Flugzeug Reparatur und Bau Anstalt - aircraft repair and manufacturing facility / Julius Kolin)
 FRuBA fighter

Fry 
(Fry Aircraft Design, Wilen bei Wollerau, Switzerland)
Fry Esprit VFII

Fs

FSS
(Gerhard Winkler / Johannes Höntsch / Flugsportgruppe Schönhagen)
 FSS-100 Tourist

Ft

FTAG Esslingen 
(Flugtechnische Arbeitsgemeinschaft an der Fachhochschule Esslingen -Hochschule für Technik e.V.)
 Esslingen E-1 a.k.a. FTAG E-1
 Esslingen E-10 a.k.a. FTAG E-10

Fu

Fuji 
(Fuji Jukogyo Kabushiki Kaisha)
 Fuji FA200 Aero Subaru
 Fuji FA300
 Fuji KM-2
 Fuji LM-1 Nikko
 Fuji LM-11 Supernikko
 Fuji LM-2 Nikko
 Fuji T-1 Hatsutaka
 Fuji T-3
 Fuji T-5
 Fuji T-7
 Fuji/Rockwell Commander 700
 Fuji/Rockwell Commander 710

Fujinawa 
(Eiichi Fujinawa)
 Fujinawa Orenco

Fukuda 
(Fukuda Kei Hikoki Seisakusho - Fukuda light Aeroplane Manufacturing Works)
 Fukuda Ki-24
 Fukuda Ki-26 
 Fukuda Hikara-6-I
 Fukuda Hikari Research-2 Motor Glider
 Fukuda/Hitachi HT-3 Research Glider

Fukunaga 
(Fukunaga Hikoki Seisakusho - Fukunaga Aeroplane Manufacturing Works)
 Fukunaga Tenryu 3 Trainer
 Fukunaga Tenryu 6 Long-range Racing Aeroplane
 Fukunaga Tenryu 7 Trainer
 Fukunaga Tenryu 8 Trainer
 Fukunaga Tenryu 9 Trainer
 Fukunaga Tenryu 10

Fuller-Hammond 
(Skycraft Industries (founders: George B Fuller & Wilbur A Hammond), 350 Washington Blvd, Venice CA.)
 Fuller-Hammond FH-1

Fulton 
(Fulton Aircraft Div, Flight Training Research Assn Inc, Continental Corp (military training devices).)
 Fulton FA-2 Airphibian
 Fulton FA-3 Airphibian

Funk 
(R R Funk, Cincinnati OH.)
 Funk Experimental

Funk 
(Akron Aircraft Co Inc (founders: Joseph & Howard Funk, with a business consortium), 277 Brown St, Akron OH)
 Funk Model B
 Funk Model C
 Funk F-2B
 Funk UC-92

Funk 
(Otto & Peter Funk)
 Greif 1 (FK-1)
 Greif 2 (FK-2)
 Funk HS203
 Funk FK-3
 Funk FK-4
 Funk FK-5
 Funk FK-6
 Funk FK-9
 Funk FK-11
 Funk Sirius 1
 Funk AK-1

Funk 
(Don D Funk Aviation Co, Broken Arrow OK. )
 Funk F-23

Fv

FVA 
(Flugwissenschaftliche Vereinigung Aachen)
 FVA-1 Schwatze Düvel (Schwarze Teufel)
 FVA-2 Blaue Maus
 FVA-3 Ente
 FVA-4 Pipö
 FVA-5 Rheinland
 FVA-9 Blaue Maus 2
 FVA-10 A Rheinland Theodor Bienen
 FVA-10 B Rheinland
 FVA-11 Eifel
 FVA-13 Olympia Jolle
 FVA-14 Ringflügel
 FVA-18 Primitivkrähe
 FVA-18/3 Silberkrähe
 FVA-20
 FVA-27

FVM 
(Flygkompaniets Verkstäder at Malmen - aircraft workshop of the Army Aviation Company at Malmen)
 FVM J.23
 FVM J.24
 FVM J.24B
 FVM Triplanet
 FVM Ö1 Tummelisa

 FVM S.18
 FVM S.21
 FVM Phönix D.III

Fw

FWA 
(Flugzeugwerke Altenrhein AG)
 FWA AS 202 Bravo
 FWA AS 32T Turbo Trainer

Fy

Fyodorov
(E.S. Fyodorov)
 Fyodorov 1907 Quintuplane

References

Further reading

External links 

 List of aircraft (F)

fr:Liste des aéronefs (E-H)